A Court of Arbitration  is a court, sometimes outside of the official judicial system of a country, that resolves certain kinds of civil disputes, primarily between industrial or commercial entities, or between employers and employees.

The Court of Arbitration of the Australian state of New South Wales, which dealt exclusively with industrial relation disputes in the early twentieth century, has been claimed to be the first court of this type in the world.  The court was unique at that time as it was the first court of its type to deal with labour relations between employer and employees on a compulsory basis.

Notable examples of such courts include:

 Arbitration Court at Saint Petersburg Chamber of Commerce and Industry
 Commonwealth Court of Conciliation and Arbitration
 Court of Arbitration (New South Wales)
 Employment Court of New Zealand, formerly known as the Court of Arbitration
 Court of Arbitration for Sport
 International Court of Arbitration (United Nations body for the resolution of international commercial disputes)
 London Court of International Arbitration (London-based, non-UN-backed, body for resolution of international disputes)
 Permanent Court of Arbitration (Hague-based, non-UN-backed, body for resolution of international disputes)
 Supreme Court of Arbitration of Russia

References